Lapile is an unincorporated community in Union County, in the U.S. state of Arkansas.

History
A post office was established at Lapile in 1877, and remained in operation until it was discontinued in 1955. The name Lapile is derived from French meaning "the pier."

References

Unincorporated communities in Union County, Arkansas
Unincorporated communities in Arkansas